Brachyglene schausi is a moth of the family Notodontidae first described by Louis Beethoven Prout in 1918. It is found in Colombia, Costa Rica, Nicaragua and Mexico.

References

Moths described in 1918
Notodontidae of South America